The 1977–78 Eredivisie was the 17th season of the highest-level basketball league in the Netherlands, and the 32nd season of the top flight Dutch basketball competition.

It was the first season with the introduction of the playoffs. Leiden (known as Parker Leiden for sponsorship reasons) won its first national championship.

Regular season

Playoffs
Teams in italics had home court advantage and played the first and third leg at home.

Bracket

Semifinals

|}

Finals

|}

Final standings

Individual awards

All-league Team

All-Defense Team

In European competitions

References

Eredivisie
Dutch Basketball League seasons